Henry Alfonso Mary Carfora (known as Carmel Henry Carfora; August 27, 1878 - January 11, 1958) was an Old Catholic.

On 12 October 1919, he became the second leader of the North American Old Roman Catholic Church, succeeding Rudolph de Landas Berghes. Carfora remained as such until his death on 11 January 1958. Carfora was succeeded by Hubert Augustus Rogers.

Carfora assumed leadership of a group of parishioners who broke away from St. Anthony of Padua Catholic Church, in Youngstown, Ohio, to found St. Rocco's Independent National Catholic Church on May 17, 1907.

His gravestone was replaced in 2015.

References

Further reading 
Anson, Peter. Bishops at Large. London: Faber and Faber, 1964.
Carfora, Carmel Henry. "Historical and Doctrinal Sketch of the Old Roman Catholic Church". Chicago, IL: North American Old Roman Catholic Church, 1950.
Melton, J. Gordon. Biographical Dictionary of American Cult and Sect Leaders. Garland Reference Library of Social Science, vol. 212. New York: Garland Publishing, 1986.
Pruter, Karl, and J. Gordon Melton. The Old Catholic Sourcebook. New York: Garland Publishing Company, 1983.
Trela, Jonathan. A History of the North American Old Roman Church. Scranton, PA: The Author, 1979.
"Carmel Henry Carfora", in Religious Leaders of America, 2nd ed. Gale Group, 1999. Reproduced in Biography Resource Center. Farmington Hills, Mich.: Thomson Gale. 2006.

1878 births
1958 deaths
American Old Catholic bishops
Presiding Archbishops of the North American Old Catholic Church
Italian emigrants to the United States
Former Roman Catholics
Italian Old Catholics
Deaths from cancer in Illinois
Deaths from pancreatic cancer
Clergy from Naples